New Year is an EP by British alternative band A Silent Film, released on April 21, 2015.

Track listing

Personnel

A Silent Film
Robert Stevenson – piano, vocals
Karl Bareham – guitar
Ali Hussain – bass
Spencer Walker – drums

References

2015 EPs
A Silent Film albums